A list of all windmills and windmill sites which lie in the current ceremonial county of East Sussex.


Locations

A - B

C

D - E

F

G

H

I - L

M - N

O - P

R - S

U - W

Locations formerly within East Sussex

For windmills in Lamberhurst see List of windmills in Kent.

Sources

Maps

1596 Robert Morden
1724 Richard Budgen
1795 Gardner & Gream
1813 Ordnance Survey
1823 C & G Greenwood

References

 
East Sussex
Windmills